Westplains is an unincorporated community in Graves County, Kentucky, United States.  As of April 2020, the Census Bureau puts the population at 12,184 residence.

References 

 

Unincorporated communities in Graves County, Kentucky
Unincorporated communities in Kentucky